Abbey Green is a hamlet in Shropshire, England at .

Abbey Green forms part of the civil parish of Whixall.

See also
Listed buildings in Whixall

External links

Hamlets in Shropshire